Preturo is a frazione in the Province of L'Aquila in the Abruzzo region of central Italy. It was a separate communed until 1927.
 
The L'Aquila-Preturo Airport is located nearby, as well as the remains of the ancient Amiternum.

Frazioni of L'Aquila
Former municipalities of the Province of L'Aquila
1927 disestablishments in Italy